Prager is an impact crater on the Moon's far side. It was named after German-American astronomer Richard Prager. It is located just to the northeast of the crater Love. Farther to the south-southeast lies Lane. To the north of this crater and leading away to the northwest is a crater chain that has been designated Catena Gregory.

This is an eroded crater formation, particularly along the northern rim which is cut across by several small craters associated with the Catena Gregory. There is a worn and somewhat elongated crater attached to the southern outer rim. The remainder of the rim is pitted by small and tiny craterlets. The interior floor is also marked by several small craterlets, including a grouping of three near the midpoint.

Satellite craters
By convention these features are identified on lunar maps by placing the letter on the side of the crater midpoint that is closest to Prager.

References

External links

 Digital Lunar Orbiter Photo Number I-136-H1

Impact craters on the Moon